Galium divaricatum is a species of flowering plant in the coffee family known by the common name Lamarck's bedstraw.

Distribution
The plant is native to the Mediterranean Basin and the Black Sea region, from Portugal and Morocco to Turkey and Crimea; as well as the Macaronesia archipelago of the eastern Atlantic Ocean, on the Azores, Canary Islands, and Madeira.

It has naturalized in Belgium, Switzerland, Australia, New Zealand,  Hawaii and scattered locations in the mainland United States.

Description
Galium divaricatumis a small annual herb with thin spreading stems up to 30 centimeters long. The small, pointed leaves are arranged in whorls of up to eight about the stem.

It bears white flowers. The fruit is a hairless nutlet.

References

External links
Photo of specimen at Missouri Botanical Garden, collected in Missouri, Galium divaricatum 
USDA Plants Profile
Photo gallery
Tela Botanica, Galium divaricatum

divaricatum
Flora of Algeria
Flora of Croatia
Flora of Greece
Flora of France
Flora of Italy
Flora of Morocco
Flora of Spain
Flora of Portugal
Flora of Romania
Flora of Serbia
Flora of Turkey
Flora of Madeira
Flora of the Canary Islands
Flora of the Azores
Plants described in 1788
Taxa named by Jean-Baptiste Lamarck